Elizabeth Lee Owen Macdonald (May 11, 1835 – July 12, 1901) was a Canadian writer.

The daughter of Thomas Owen, the first postmaster general for Prince Edward Island (PEI), and Ann Campbell, she was born Elizabeth Lee Owen in Cardigan River and moved to Charlottetown with her family while still young. Her brother Lemuel later served as premier of PEI.

In 1863, she married Andrew Archibald Macdonald; although she was Anglican her husband was Catholic which was controversial at the time. The couple had four sons. While her husband was lieutenant-governor, she attended openings and closing of the provincial legislature, as well as various other special events. She also contributed her time and financial support to St. Peter's Cathedral in Charlottetown.

She contributed a series of nine articles describing life in Charlottetown fifty years early in the Prince Edward Island Magazine.

Macdonald died from complications due to diabetes in Charlottetown at the age of 66.

Her son Aeneas served in the provincial legislature.

References 

1835 births
1901 deaths
19th-century Canadian women writers
19th-century Canadian non-fiction writers
Writers from Prince Edward Island
Canadian women non-fiction writers